Sheykhian Mari (also Romanized as  Sheykhīān Mārī; also known as Sheykheyān, Sheykhīān, and Sheykhīyan) is a village in Kabgan Rural District, Kaki District, Dashti County, Bushehr Province, Iran. At the 2006 census, its population was 222, in 48 families.

References 

Populated places in Dashti County